Perrot State Park is a state park in Wisconsin's Driftless Area at the confluence of the Trempealeau and Mississippi rivers. The  park features views of steep limestone bluffs and the river valleys. It has observation platforms for watching wildlife, including the variety of birds which inhabit or migrate through the park. Hiking trails and camping are available. Mountain bike trails penetrate deep inside the park.

The park protects two State Natural Areas including Brady's Bluff Prairie and Trempealeau Mountain, a cone-shaped mountain surrounded by water. The Native Americans of the area traditionally considered the mountain sacred and used it as a landmark for meetings. Some earthwork mounds made by ancient Native American cultures are located in the park.

This facility protects the site of one of the earliest encampments by European explorers in the upper Mississippi. The park is named for Nicolas Perrot, a French explorer who was the first to write about the area.

External links

Perrot State Park official website

Driftless Area
Protected areas on the Mississippi River
Protected areas of Trempealeau County, Wisconsin
Religious places of the indigenous peoples of North America
State parks of Wisconsin
Protected areas established in 1918
Mountains of Wisconsin
Nature centers in Wisconsin
1918 establishments in Wisconsin
Civilian Conservation Corps in Wisconsin